The de Havilland T.K.4 was a 1930s British single-seat racing monoplane designed and built by students of the de Havilland Technical School.

Design and development
The T.K.4 was built by students at Stag Lane Aerodrome in 1937 with the aim of building the smallest possible aircraft around the 140 hp (104 kW) de Havilland Gipsy Major II. It was a low-wing monoplane with a conventional retractable tailwheel landing gear and had a De Havilland PD30 variable-pitch propeller and was fitted with slots and flaps.
The only T.K.4, registered G-AETK, was first flown on 30 July 1937. It was 9th in the 1937 King's Cup air race at a speed of 230.5 mph. The aircraft crashed on 1 October 1937 killing the pilot R.J. Waight while he was attempting a 100 km class record.

Specifications

Notes

References

1930s British sport aircraft
T.K.4
Racing aircraft
Low-wing aircraft
Single-engined tractor aircraft
Aircraft first flown in 1937